Medoc is an unincorporated community in Jasper County, in the U.S. state of Missouri.

History
Medoc was platted in 1856, and named after the Medoc Indians. A post office called Medoc was established in 1854, and remained in operation until 1927.

References

Unincorporated communities in Jasper County, Missouri
Unincorporated communities in Missouri